The Divine Heritage of the Yadavas (in some sources, Yadavs) is a book by Vithal Krishnaji Khedkar (a descendant of Yadavas of Devagiri whose forefathers were Tehsildars of Khede) which describes a divine heritage from Krishna for those Hindu communities (Jātis) occupied with herding cattle and selling milk. The book posits that the cattle-keeping castes   had become incorrectly ranked as Shudra (labourers) in the varna system for a variety of reasons: their adherence to ritual purity was difficult to verify due to their nomadic lifestyle, they castrated animals, and they sold milk commercially. The scholar David Goodman Mandelbaum describes the work as "combin[ing] a traditional origin myth and a highly modernized improvement campaign."

Khedkar's book was revised in 1924 by his son, the surgeon Raghunath Vithal Khedkar, and published in Allahabad in 1959.

References

Books about the caste system in India
1959 non-fiction books
Ahir history